Khao Rom is a  mountain in Nakhon Ratchasima Province, Thailand. It is the highest peak of the Sankamphaeng Range, between eastern Thailand and Isan.

History
Khao Rom is also known as Khao Khiao (เขาเขียว), also spelt Khao Khieo, and was known as "Green Hill" during the Vietnam War. At that time there was a US military Air Defense Radar Station of the 621 TCS Tactical Control Squadron, Khao Khieo RTAB TH "Dressy Lady", at the top of the mountain which is roughly midway between Bangkok and Korat. This peak should not be confused with other mountains in Thailand having the name Khao Khiao, including one in the same range.

Hiking
This mountain is surrounded by forests and, like a great portion of the Sankamphaeng Range, it is part of the Khao Yai National Park area. The former US radar station is now run by the Royal Thai Armed Forces and is guarded by the military. Although the highest point of the mountain is not accessible to the public, there is a viewpoint near the entrance with beautiful views over the surrounding landscape on clear days.

Land leeches are common in the bushy undergrowth and under the leaves of low branches close to narrow forest paths.

See also
Khao Yai National Park
List of mountains in Thailand

References

External links
Get to know Khaoyai
Units to operate the TACS

Geography of Nakhon Ratchasima province
Mountains of Thailand
Sankamphaeng Range